William Fox (born 19 May 1939), known professionally as James Fox, is an English actor. He appeared in several notable films of the 1960s and early 1970s, including King Rat, The Servant, Thoroughly Modern Millie and Performance, before quitting the screen for several years to be an evangelical Christian. He has since appeared in a wide range of film and television productions.

Early life
Fox was born on 19 May 1939 in London, the second son of theatrical agent Robin Fox and actress Angela Worthington. His elder brother is actor Edward Fox and his younger brother is film producer Robert Fox. His maternal grandfather was playwright Frederick Lonsdale. Like several members of the Fox family, he attended Harrow School. After leaving Harrow, Fox took a short service commission in the Coldstream Guards.

Career

Early career
Fox first appeared on film in The Miniver Story in 1950. His early screen appearances, both in film and television, were made under his birth name, William Fox.

He was working in a bank when Tony Richardson offered him a minor role in the film The Loneliness of the Long Distance Runner (1962). Fox's father attempted to forbid this, claiming that his son had no talent for acting and that it would disrupt his life for him to give up his job in the bank; nevertheless, Fox took the part.

In 1964, he won a BAFTA Award for Most Promising Newcomer for his role in The Servant (1963).

On 16 June 1965, Ken Annakin's Those Magnificent Men in Their Flying Machines was released. In this British period comedy film, Fox is featured among an international ensemble cast including Stuart Whitman, Sarah Miles, Robert Morley, Terry-Thomas, Red Skelton, Benny Hill, Jean-Pierre Cassel, Gert Fröbe and Alberto Sordi. The film, revolving around the craze of early aviation around 1910, is about a pompous newspaper magnate (Morley) who is convinced by his daughter (Miles) and her fiancé (Fox), a young army officer, to organize an air race from London to Paris. A large sum of money is offered to the winner, attracting a variety of characters to participate. The film received positive reviews, being described as funny, colourful and clever, and as capturing the early enthusiasm for aviation. It was treated as a major production, one of only three full-length 70 mm Todd-AO Fox releases in 1965 with an intermission and musical interlude part of the original screenings. The film was initially an exclusive roadshow presentation shown in deluxe Cinerama venues, where customers needed reserved seats purchased ahead of time. The film grossed $31,111,111 theatrically and on home video $29,950,000. Audience reaction, both in first release and even today, is nearly universal in assessing the film as one of the "classic" aviation films.

Some of the other films he acted in during this time are King Rat (1965), The Chase (1966), Thoroughly Modern Millie (1967), Isadora (1968), and Performance (1970).

Spiritual life and break from acting
After finishing work on Performance (released 1970, but shot in 1968), Fox suspended his acting career. The film co-starring James Fox and Mick Jagger was deemed so outrageous that critics at a preview screening walked out, with one film executive's wife reportedly throwing up in the cinema.

In a 2008 interview, he said: "It was just part of my journey...I think my journey was to spend a while away from acting. And I never lost contact with it – watching movies, reading about it ... so I didn't feel I missed it."

He became an evangelical Christian, working with the Navigators and devoting himself to the ministry. During this time, the only film in which Fox appeared was No Longer Alone (1976), the story of Joan Winmill Brown, a suicidal woman who was led to faith in Jesus Christ by Ruth Bell Graham.

Return to acting
After an absence from acting of several years, in 1981 Fox appeared on television in the Play for Today "Country" by Trevor Griffiths, a comedy drama set against the 1945 UK parliamentary elections. On film he starred in Stephen Poliakoff's Runners (1983), A Passage to India (1984), and Comrades (1986). He played Anthony Blunt in the  BBC play by Alan Bennett, A Question of Attribution (1992). He also portrayed the character of Lord Holmes in Patriot Games (1992), as well as Colonel Ferguson in Farewell to the King and the Nazi-sympathising aristocrat Lord Darlington in The Remains of the Day (1993).

He has since appeared in the 2000 film Sexy Beast, the 2001 adaptation of The Lost World as Prof. Leo Summerlee, Agatha Christie's Poirot – Death on the Nile (2004) as Colonel Race and Charlie and the Chocolate Factory (2005) playing Mr. Salt, Veruca Salt's father. He appeared in the Doctor Who audio drama Shada, and in 2007, he guest-starred in the British television crime series Waking the Dead. He also appeared opposite his son Laurence Fox in "Allegory of Love", an episode in the third series of Lewis. He was part of the cast of Sherlock Holmes (2009), as Sir Thomas, leading member of a freemason-like secret society.

In 2010, he filmed Cleanskin, a terrorist thriller directed by Hadi Hajaig, and in 2011 he played King George V in Madonna's film W.E.

Personal life
Fox married Mary Elizabeth Piper in September 1973, with whom he has five children: four sons, Robin, Thomas, Laurence, Jack, and a daughter, Lydia. Piper died at their home on 19 April 2020.

Through his daughter Lydia, his son-in-law is actor Richard Ayoade. His former daughter-in-law is actress Billie Piper, who was married to his son Laurence from 2007 to 2016.

Filmography

Film

Television

References

External links
 
 
 
  
 
 
 
 The Guardian – "'Acting ... ? It paid for a bicycle, I seem to remember'"
 James Fox Cast Photograph with Sophie Marceau and Petr Shelokhonov filming Anna Karenina in Russia: 

1939 births
Living people
20th-century English male actors
21st-century English male actors
BAFTA Most Promising Newcomer to Leading Film Roles winners
Converts to Christianity
English Christians
English male film actors
English male television actors
Male actors from London
People educated at Harrow School
Robin Fox family